Reaction Time: Climate Change and the Nuclear Option is a book by Professor Ian Lowe which was officially launched by science broadcaster Robyn Williams at the Writers' Festival in Brisbane in September 2007.  The book is about energy policy, and Lowe argues that nuclear power does not make sense on any level: economically, environmentally, politically or socially.

Themes
Ian Lowe, AO, explains that energy is essential for civilised living, and says our energy-intensive lifestyle based on fossil fuels is unsustainable, and that he believes fundamental improvements must be made. In his book he says: "the nuclear option does not make sense on any level: economically, environmentally, politically or socially. It is too costly, too dangerous, too slow and has too small an impact on global warming."

Quote
"Promoting nuclear power as the solution to climate change is like advocating smoking as a cure for obesity. That is, taking up the nuclear option will make it much more difficult to move to the sort of sustainable, ecologically healthy future that should be our goal."

Author
Professor Lowe is the Emeritus professor of Science, Technology and Society at Griffith University and the former President of the Australian Conservation Foundation.

See also

Anti-nuclear movement in Australia
List of books about nuclear issues
Renewable energy commercialization
List of Australian environmental books
Quarterly Essay

References

External links
Is nuclear the answer?

Environmental non-fiction books
2007 non-fiction books
2007 in the environment
Australian non-fiction books
Climate change books
Energy policy
Nuclear power
Sustainability books
Books about nuclear issues
Books by Ian Lowe
Black Inc books